The 2022–23 season is the 139th season in the existence of Tranmere Rovers Football Club and the club's third consecutive season in League Two. In addition to the league, they will also compete in the 2022–23 FA Cup, the 2022–23 EFL Cup and the 2022–23 EFL Trophy.

Transfers

In

Out

Loans in

Loans out

Pre-season and friendlies
On June 16, Tranmere announced their pre-season schedule.

Competitions

Overall record

League Two

League table

Results summary

Results by round

Matches

On 23 June, the league fixtures were announced.

FA Cup

Rovers were drawn away to Carlisle United in the first round.

EFL Cup

Tranmere were drawn away to Accrington Stanley in the first round and at home to Newcastle United in the second round.

EFL Trophy

On 20 June, the initial Group stage draw was made, grouping Tranmere Rovers with Bolton Wanderers and Crewe Alexandra.

References

Tranmere Rovers
Tranmere Rovers F.C. seasons
English football clubs 2022–23 season